"Two in a Million" is a song by British pop group S Club 7, released as the third single from their debut studio album, S Club (1999), on 13 December 1999. The single was released as a double A-side with "You're My Number One" in UK, but in other countries, it was issued as a stand-alone single. The single debuted at number five on the UK Singles Chart and peaked at number two in January 2000. In New Zealand, "Two in a Million" became the band's third consecutive number-one single, after "Bring It All Back" and "S Club Party".

Single information
"Two in a Million" is described as "a song about falling in love, having somebody to comfort you, and someone to be there for you no matter what." The song sees Jo O'Meara taking sole lead vocals for the first time. The album version of "Two in a Million" and the Boyfriends & Birthdays version (so named as it was the theme song of their BBC TV movie) are almost exactly the same, except the Boyfriends & Birthdays version has slightly more robust instrumentation, taking on a more orchestral and R&B approach, and pauses the music during the last line of each verse right before the chorus. The latter is included on the North American version of 7. Moreover, the demo version of the song, as heard on Miami 7, includes horns in the arrangement, which were removed for album release and replaced with a more subtle French horn arrangement alongside the live string orchestration in the Boyfriends & Birthdays version.

The single includes an exclusive B-side, "We Can Work it Out", which was performed during episode eight of Miami 7, "Alien Hunter". The track was again co-written by Mike Rose and Nick Foster, who wrote "You're My Number One". The UK release of the single includes the Miami 7 version of "You're My Number One", while the Australian release replaces this with the Jason Nevins remix of "S Club Party". The US release opts for a completely different B-side, containing an exclusive club mix of "Two in a Million" by Mark Penchotti, which has never been released elsewhere.

Music video
The music video was shot in Los Angeles, California and sees the group all together in a house getting ready for a party. The video has a "black and white" theme to it, in that, in the beginning, the group are dressed in white clothes except for Hannah who was dressed in black clothes and surrounded by white walls and furniture. They then sing together on a sofa. The group are seen to be getting ready for a party; the boys are shaving in the bathroom and the girls are trying on clothes in the bedroom. The group then move outside, where they continue performing beside a swimming pool. The colours change to black; they wear black clothes and there is dark lighting. People soon join them and the group sing and dance until the end of the video. The video has gained over one million views on YouTube as of 11 September 2014. The band's record company Universal Music Group added the video to the track on to their YouTube channel on 11 October 2008, prompting it to be one of the week's most viewed videos with over 140,000 views in under 48 hours.

Track listings

 UK CD1
 "Two in a Million" (Boyfriends & Birthdays version)
 "You're My Number One" (Miami 7 version)
 "We Can Work It Out"
 "Two in a Million" (CD-ROM video)

 UK CD2
 "You're My Number One" (Miami 7 version)
 "Two in a Million" (2000 version)
 "Down at Club S"
 "You're My Number One" (CD-ROM video)

 UK cassette single
A. "Two in a Million" (Boyfriends & Birthdays version)
B. "You're My Number One" (Miami 7 version)

 Australasian CD single
 "Two in a Million" (Boyfriends & Birthdays version)
 "Two in a Million" (2000 version)
 "S Club Party" (Jason Nevins club mix)
 "Two in a Million" (CD-ROM video)

 US CD single
 "Two in a Million" (Boyfriends & Birthdays version)
 "Two in a Million" (Mark Penchotti club mix)
 "S Club Party" (snippet)
 "You're My Number One" (snippet)

Credits and personnel
Credits are lifted from the S Club album booklet.

Studios
 Recorded at StarGate Studios (Norway)
 Mastered at Transfermation (London, England)

Personnel
 Cathy Dennis – writing
 Simon Ellis – writing
 StarGate – production
 Noel Summerville – mastering
 Richard Dowling – mastering

Charts and certifications

Weekly charts
"Two in a Million" / "You're My Number One"

"Two in a Million"

Year-end charts

Certifications

References

S Club 7 songs
1999 singles
1999 songs
Number-one singles in New Zealand
Polydor Records singles
Songs written by Cathy Dennis
Songs written by Simon Ellis (record producer)
Song recordings produced by Stargate (record producers)